Patrick Engeu Ogwang is a Ugandan pharmacist, pharmacologist, ethnobotanist, medical researcher and entrepreneur, who serves as an associate professor and Head of the Department of Pharmacy at Mbarara University in Uganda. He concurrently serves as the Executive Chairman of Jena Herbals Uganda Limited, a private company that he founded that manufactures Covidex.

Covidex is a herbal extract from three indigenous Ugandan plants, which has shown activity against a number of human viruses including COVID-19.

Background and education
Ogwang was born circa 1973, in Otuboi Village, in Kaberamaido District, in Uganda's Eastern Region. His father was an Itesot and his mother was Langi. His father died first and then his mother also passed away. Ogwang was then raised by an uncle.

While growing up, he observed how his mother would preserve different herbs and prepare them for her children when they fell ill with minor ailments such as fever, stomach pains and upper respiratory infections. He would later take a deep interest in these plants, including laboratory analysis.

After attending local primary school, he studied at St. Mary's College Kisubi, in Wakiso District, where he obtained his high school diploma in the mid 1990s. He was admitted to Makerere University, where he graduated with a Bachelor of Pharmacy. He followed that with a Master of Pharmacology, from Makerere University as well. His third degree is a Doctor of Philosophy in Pharmacology, from the same university.

Innovation and Research
Beginning circa 2004, Ogwang began serious study of the chemical compounds in the medicinal plants that were in his mother's "first aid kit". He began tinkering with various combinations and mixtures together with different concentrations and dilutions. According to media interviews he has given, he came up with a compound that has prevented one of his family members from suffering sickle cell crises for nearly 20 years. Another compound, when taken all year, provides immunity against contracting malaria. Ogwang also took off time and volunteered at the National Chemotherapeutic Research Institute (NCRI], in Wandegeya, under Dr. Grace Nambatya Kyeyune.

Covidex
In 2020, when an American visiting professor contracted COVD-19 in Uganda, Ogwang modified a concoction that he had been developing to treat viral mouth ulcers. He gave it to the American to drop into his nostrils several times a day. Prior research had shown that the mixture had antiviral properties. The visitor made a full recovery in short order! A colleague of the guest professor who had traveled with him to Uganda also fell ill with COVID-19 and was also helped, without having to be admitted.

In May/June 2021, when the delta variant of the COVID-19 made its entry into Uganda, Ogwang shared his anti-COVID-19 nasal drops with some family members and close friends and they all got better. Then Professor Ogwang himself came down with COVID-19. He used his medicine which he calls Covidex to heal himself. After he had about 10 documented cases, he approached the National Drug Authority for an emergency license. He was awarded a temporary emergency license, while he arranges full clinical trials. Medical practitioners may use Covidex along with other treatment regimens, since Covidex is known to have anti-viral properties.

Way forward
Professor Ogwang estimates that controlled random clinical trials for Covidex will cost about USh2 billion (approx. US$565,000). As of July 2021, he and his team are writing the protocols to follow during the clinical trials. The government of Uganda has indicated willingness to fund the clinical trials.

Family
Patrick Ogwang is a married father of two children. His wife is a medical doctor, who works at Mulago National Referral Hospital.

Other considerations
Professor Ogwang has in the past, served as president of the Pharmaceutical Association of Uganda (PAU). PAU advocates, champions and governs pharmacists and pharmaceutical practice in Uganda.

References

External links
I first used Covidex to cure an American, but Museveni didn't believe me until I got Covid-19 myself- Prof Ogwang As of 6 July 2021.
Jena Herbals Uganda Limited https://www.jenaherbals.com/ As of 24 December 2021
Mbarara University of Science and Technology (MUST) https://www.must.ac.ug/  As of 25 December 2021
National Drug Authority (Uganda) https://www.nda.or.ug/ As of 25.12.2021
Natural Chemotherapeutics Research Institute (NCRI) https://ncri.go.ug/ As of 25 December 2021
Pharmaceutical Association of Uganda (PAU) https://psu.or.ug/ As 25 December 2021
Pharm-Bio Technology and Traditional Medicine Center (PHARMBIOTRAC) http://pharmbiotrac.must.ac.ug/ 

Living people
1973 births
Itesot people
Ugandan pharmacists
Ugandan pharmacologists
Makerere University alumni
HIV/AIDS researchers
Ugandan medical researchers
People from Kaberamaido District
People from Eastern Region, Uganda
Academic staff of Mbarara University
People educated at St. Mary's College Kisubi